The National Resource Center (NRC) Program of the U.S. Department of Education provides funding grants to American universities to establish, strengthen, and operate language and area or international studies centers that will be national resources for teaching any modern foreign language.

Also known as Title VI grants, because the program is formally established in Title VI, Part A, § 602 of the Higher Education Act of 1965 (Title VI was originally authorized as Title VI of the National Defense Education Act of 1958 as a response to the launch of Sputnik I and the U.S. government’s recognition that a stronger and broader capacity in foreign language and area studies was needed.), these grants support undergraduate and graduate programs that focus on: 
 instruction of fields and topics that provide full understanding of areas, regions or countries;
 research and training in international studies;
 work in the language aspects of professional fields and research, and
 instruction and research on issues critical to current world affairs.

The NRC grants are awarded on a quadrennial schedule, through a competition overseen by the Office of International and Foreign Language Education (formerly the International Education Programs Service) within the Department of Education.  The most recent award competition provided funding for the FY 2018–2021 period.

List of National Resource Centers

References

External links
 International Education Programs Service

United States Department of Education
Higher education in the United States
Education finance in the United States
Grants (money)